Trevor Jackson may refer to:

Trevor Jackson (performer) (born 1996), American teen actor, singer, and dancer
Trevor Jackson (musician), musician in British dance act Playgroup
Trevor Jackson (diver) (born 1965), Australian technical diver, shipwreck researcher, author and inventor